Carlos Paulo Simões (born 11 June 1951), is an Angolan actor and writer. He is best known for the roles in the films Operation Autumn, The Consul of Bordeaux and Cacau da Ribeira.

Filmography

References

External links
 

Living people
Portuguese film directors
Angolan writers
Angolan film directors
1951 births